Billy Stephens (28 July 1918 – 16 September 2006) was  a former Australian rules footballer who played with Footscray in the Victorian Football League (VFL).

Notes

External links 
		

1918 births
2006 deaths
Australian rules footballers from Victoria (Australia)
Western Bulldogs players